Salvatore Lopes is an American photographer and printer.

He was a recipient of the 2013 Anchor Award from the University of Hartford's Alumni Association.

Lopes received his BA and MA from the University of Hartford in Connecticut. After teaching in the Hartford school system and devising a photographic program to promote reading and writing skills, he joined Richard Benson's studio in Newport, Rhode Island, in the 1970s. There, exhibitions and edition portfolios were produced from images by Paul Strand and Edward Weston.

Later, Lopes continued the printing business on his own and specialized in the archival 19th century technique of platinum prints, developing his own style of hand-coated prints.

Photographic work
Over a period of five years in the 1980s Lopes created a body of personal work documenting the newly built Vietnam Veterans Memorial in Washington, DC. He captured the intense emotions of mourning, healing and loss among its visitors. The work culminated in the book, The Wall: Images and Offerings From The Vietnam Veterans Memorial. One-man exhibitions followed at the Chrysler Museum, International Center of Photography, the Art Institute of Chicago, the San Francisco Museum of Art and elsewhere. This work was also shown on the ABC television news show Nightline in 1986.

Lopes’ next project was another memorial, but this time dealing with AIDS. He produced a documentary in three sections: First, covering the traveling AIDS quilt in Boston and Washington; second, a volunteer Buddy program through the AIDS Action Committee in Boston which paired volunteer companions with persons with AIDS; and third, documenting the daily life of a childless couple John and Sharon Boyce who adopted five HIV siblings, and of the care and love given to the youngest, Brianna, who received home treatments for AIDS for four years and died shortly before the book, Living with AIDS: A Photographic Journal, was published. There was a subsequent series of traveling exhibitions.

More recently, he has resumed his work in street photography, which dates back to the late 1970s. He also continues the abstract work: Images of Water, which are no longer in the documentary vein. Some are printed in platinum, although he has also experimented with digital imaging and color printing. Other projects include: surrealistic macro images, Newport Jazz, Images of Horses, Macro Images, and Tree Forms. His photographs are found in permanent museum collections.

Lopes has had experience as a workshop instructor, teaching at the Maine Photographic Workshops, Savannah Photographic Workshops, in Turin, Italy, in California with Cole Weston, and at his studios in Newport and Boston.

Photographic printer
Lopes' range of printing encompasses the Civil War photographers Mathew Brady and Alexander Gardner to many contemporary photographers. His biggest client was Horst P. Horst until Horst's death. Lopes has printed the work of: Carrie Mae Weems, George Hoyningen-Huene, Alfred Stieglitz, Robert Mapplethorpe, Herb Ritts, Mary Ellen Mark, Ruth Bernhard, Helen Levitt, Robert Rauschenberg, George Platt Lynes, Anderson and Low, James Fee, Linda Connor, Lisette Model, Lotte Jacobi, Peter Lindbergh, Richard Gere, Phil Trager, Greg Gorman, Mark Seliger, Keith Carter, Henry Horenstein, Philippe Halsman, Nadav Kander, Ralph Mecke, Jill Freedman, Louis Faurer, and others. 

He has had commissions from the Nickolas Muray Archives (portraits of Frida Kahlo), Aperture Foundation for David Wojnarowicz, the estate of Paul Strand, Edward Weston, Barbara Morgan, Dorothea Lange, Minor White, from the estate of Edward Weston, Life Gallery of Photography (Margaret Bourke-White), Vision Gallery (Ruth Bernhard, Judy Dater, Paul Caponigro, Otto Hagel, Hansel Mieth, Mario Cravo), the estate of Edward Weston, Staley-Wise Gallery, Fahey/Klein Gallery, Debra Heimerdinger Fine Art (David Halliday), Light Work, Camera Work, Berlin, and Roger Urban.

Publications
The Wall: Images and Offerings From The Vietnam Veterans Memorial. Collins, 1987
Living with AIDS: A Photographic Journal. Bullfinch/Little Brown, 1994
Life behind the Metaphor: Rudolf Nureyev and the Dutch National Ballet. The Nureyev Legacy Project, 2007

Awards
2013: Anchor Award, University of Hartford's Alumni Association. The award recognizes alumni "who have distinguished themselves by achieving the highest level of professional accomplishments and who possess absolute standards of integrity and character".

Exhibitions

Wadsworth Atheneum, Hartford, CT, 1974
Washington Project for the Arts, Washington, DC, 1987
The Wall: Photographed by Sal Lopes, Chrysler Museum of Art, Norfolk, VA 1987–1988
San Francisco Museum of Modern Art, San Francisco, CA, 1988
Carroll Reece Museum, East Tennessee State University, 1988
The Art Institute of Chicago, Chicago, IL, 1988
Addison Gallery of American Art, Andover, MA, 1989
Aspen Art Museum, Aspen, CO, 1989
Grove Gallery, University of California at San Diego, San Diego, CA, 1989
The Indomitable Spirit, International Center of Photography (ICP) New York, 1990
Vietnam Memorial, International Center of Photography (ICP) New York, 1990
Arvada Center for the Arts and Humanities, Arvada, CO, 1990
Living with AIDS, Chrysler Museum of Art, Norfolk, VA, 1994
Williams College Museum of Art, Williamstown, MA, 1997
Horse Attitudes, The Contemporary Art Center of Virginia, 1999
Danforth Museum, Framingham, MA, 2000
Musée de l'Élysée, Lausanne, Switzerland, 2002
Reiss Engelhorn Museum, Mannheim, Germany, 2003
Springfield Museum of Fine Arts, Springfield, MA
Telfair Museum, Savannah, Georgia: Water Works

Collections
Chrysler Museum of Art, Norfolk, VA

References

External links

Living people
Social documentary photographers
Street photographers
American portrait photographers
Place of birth missing (living people)
Year of birth missing (living people)
Concert photographers
Equine artists
Nature photographers
University of Hartford alumni